Return to PopoloCrois: A Story of Seasons Fairytale, known in Japan as , is a farming simulation role-playing game for the Nintendo 3DS.

Reception

The game received above-average reviews according to the review aggregation website Metacritic.

James Cunningham of Hardcore Gamer said, "While it takes a bit to get all its gameplay elements into place, Return to PopoloCrois: A Story of Seasons Fairy Tale is thoroughly charming from the very start." Chris Carter of Destructoid said, "The core story is roughly 30 hours or so, but you can mess around with all of the side content and the farming aspect for far beyond that, which is a perfect excuse to spend weeks on end with a portable." In Japan, Famitsu gave it a score of 31 out of 40.

References

External links

2015 video games
Crossover role-playing video games
Marvelous Entertainment
Nintendo 3DS games
Nintendo 3DS eShop games
Nintendo 3DS-only games
Nintendo Network games
Video games developed in Japan
Story of Seasons spin-off games
Xseed Games games
Single-player video games